Red Rock Canyon  may refer to:

Parks 
Red Rock Canyon National Conservation Area, Clark County, Nevada
Red Rock Canyon Open Space, Colorado Springs, Colorado
Red Rock Canyon State Park (California), Kern County, California
Red Rock Canyon State Park (Oklahoma), Caddo County, Oklahoma

Canyons 
Red Rock Canyon; Waterton Lakes National Park, Alberta
Red Rock Canyon; Cochise County, Arizona
Red Rock Canyon; Maricopa County, Arizona
Red Rock Canyon; Imperial County, California
Red Rock Canyon; Lassen County, California
Red Rock Canyon; Los Angeles County, California
Red Rock Canyon; Mono County, California
Red Rock Canyon; San Luis Obispo County, California
Red Rock Canyon; Orange County, California (within Limestone Canyon & Whiting Ranch Wilderness Park)
Red Rock Canyon; El Paso County, Colorado
Red Rock Canyon; La Plata County, Colorado
Red Rock Canyon; Las Animas County, Colorado
Red Rock Canyon; Moffat County, Colorado
Red Rock Canyon; Montrose County, Colorado
Left Fork Red Rock Canyon; Rio Blanco County, Colorado
Middle Fork Red Rock Canyon; Rio Blanco County, Colorado
Red Rock Canyon; Rio Blanco County, Colorado
Red Rock Canyon; Saguache County, Colorado
Red Rock Canyon; Bear Lake County, Idaho
Red Rock Canyon; Clark County, Nevada: in Red Rock Canyon National Conservation Area
Redrock Canyon; Lander County, Nevada
Red Rock Canyon; Nye County, Nevada
Red Rock Canyon; Storey County, Nevada
Red Rock Canyon; Washoe County, Nevada
Red Rock Canyon; White Pine County, Nevada
Redrock Canyon; Grant County, New Mexico
Red Rock Canyon; Jackson County, Oregon
Red Rock Canyon; Malheur County, Oregon
Red Rock Canyon; Burnet County, Texas
Red Rock Canyon; Summit County, Utah

See also 
Red Rock State Park, Sedona, Arizona